The Power of Love Tour was the debut headlining concert tour by English singer Sam Bailey in early 2015. The tour supported Bailey's debut album The Power of Love (2014), which was released after her win on the tenth series of The X Factor in 2013.

Background 
Bailey promoted The Power of Love on her first tour, The Power of Love Tour, which visited 17 cities in the United Kingdom with 4 sold out dates and grossed £760,000 with 19,409 attending. The tour was announced on her website and other official outlets. An official announcement stated that Bailey would perform two pre-shows a few days before the official tour start date on 29 January 2015. The tour officially commenced on 29 January with two sold out dates at the De Montford Hall in Leicester, England and ended on 18 February in London.

Set list
This set list is representative of the show on 29 January 2015 in Leicester.

 "Ain't No Mountain High Enough"
 "Sunshine on a Rainy Day"
 "The Power of Love"
 "No More Tears (Enough Is Enough)"
 "Superwoman"
 "Get Here" 
 "From This Moment On" (Shania Twain cover) 
 "How Will I Know"
 "Through the Fire"
 "Listen"
 "Lord Is It Mine" 
 "Clown"
 "Signed, Sealed, Delivered I'm Yours" 
 "Sisters Are Doin' It for Themselves"
 "Somebody to Love"
 "We Close Our Eyes"
 "To Love You More" 
 "Declaration of Love"
 "And I Am Telling You I'm Not Going"
 "Skyscraper"

Shows

References 

2015 concert tours